Dan Levenson (born c. 1955) is an American old-time musician and storyteller.  He sings and plays the five-string banjo, fiddle, and guitar, specializing in the music of Appalachia.

A long-time member of the Boiled Buzzards string band, he has released several recordings and an instructional video for the clawhammer banjo.  He has also written two instructional books on clawhammer banjo, and writes for Banjo Newsletter.  Levenson was voted one of the United States's top ten clawhammer banjo players by Banjo Newsletter readers.

Levenson has won several competitions and travels the United States performing and leading workshops in playing the banjo.

Originally from Pittsburgh, Pennsylvania, he lives in Tucson, Arizona.

Discography
Salt and Grease (with The Boiled Buzzards)
A Reason To Dance (with Rick Thum)
New Frontier (with Kim Murley)
Fine Dining (with The Boiled Buzzards)
Eat At Joe's (with The Boiled Buzzards)
Early Bird Special (with The Boiled Buzzards)
Light of the Moon (2001)
Barenaked Banjos
Traveling Home (2006)

External links
Official site
Dan Levenson biography
NAMM Oral History Interview

Living people
1950s births
American fiddlers
American folk guitarists
American male guitarists
American banjoists
Old-time musicians
People from Gallia County, Ohio
American storytellers
20th-century American guitarists
Musicians from Pittsburgh
Guitarists from Ohio
21st-century American violinists
20th-century American male musicians
21st-century American male musicians